South Fork Township is an inactive township in Howell County, in the U.S. state of Missouri.

South Fork Township takes its name from South Fork Spring River.

References

Townships in Missouri
Townships in Howell County, Missouri